Pierre-Yves Copin (born 25 April 1951) is a French former swimmer. He competed in the men's 4 × 200 metre freestyle relay at the 1972 Summer Olympics.

References

External links
 

1951 births
Living people
Olympic swimmers of France
Swimmers at the 1972 Summer Olympics
Place of birth missing (living people)
French male freestyle swimmers